= Peeds, Virginia =

Unincorporated community in Virginia, US

Coordinates: 38°06′02″N 76°55′21″W

Peeds is an unincorporated community in Westmoreland County, in the U. S. state of Virginia.
